Nada Spasić (born 1934) is a Yugoslav gymnast. She competed in seven events at the 1952 Summer Olympics.

References

1934 births
Living people
Yugoslav female artistic gymnasts
Olympic gymnasts of Yugoslavia
Gymnasts at the 1952 Summer Olympics
Place of birth missing (living people)